Sylvia Harris (born 17 March 1965) is a British archer. She competed in the women's individual and team events at the 1992 Summer Olympics.

References

External links
 

1965 births
Living people
British female archers
Olympic archers of Great Britain
Archers at the 1992 Summer Olympics
Sportspeople from Chorley